The 1954 Ole Miss Rebels football team represented the University of Mississippi during the 1954 college football season. The Rebels were led by eighth-year head coach Johnny Vaught and played their home games at Hemingway Stadium in Oxford, Mississippi and Crump Stadium in Memphis, Tennessee. Ole Miss was champion of the Southeastern Conference, finishing the regular season with a record of 9–1 (5–0 SEC), and ranked 6th in both major polls. They were invited to the 1955 Sugar Bowl, where they lost to Navy.

Schedule

Roster
OT Rex Reed Bogan
FB Paige Cothren
QB Eagle Day, Jr.
FB Billy Kinard
Bobby McCool
DB Jimmy Patton

References

Ole Miss
Southeastern Conference football champion seasons
Ole Miss Rebels football seasons
Ole Miss Rebels football